Labeo lineatus is a species of ray-finned fish in the family Cyprinidae. It is found only throughout the Congo Basin. Its natural habitats are rivers and freshwater lakes.

References

Labeo
Fish described in 1898
Taxonomy articles created by Polbot